Sit and Be Fit is a television exercise program for older adults and anyone needing slow gentle movement. The program is broadcast throughout the United States, distributed to public television stations (although not by WNET). Sit and Be Fit programs are also available on DVD.

The series was created in 1987 by Mary Ann Wilson, a registered nurse specializing in the field of post-polio rehabilitation and geriatrics.

Wilson recognized the need for functional exercise, especially for moderately active seniors or those managing chronic conditions or needing rehabilitation from strokes, heart attacks or other injuries.

The show's mission statement is: "Sit and Be Fit is committed to improving the quality of life of older adults and  physically limited individuals through safe, effective exercises that are available through television, videos, personal appearances, classes, seminars, books, and the Internet. The show actively promotes functional fitness, healing, and independence, and is an effective resource for professionals in aging and fitness."

Organization
Sit and Be Fit is a non-profit organization that produces North America's health education and exercise television series. The series, hosted by Wilson, and developed with a team of medical and fitness professionals, has earned a loyal following due to its effectiveness in improving the health and wellness of participants. It has been broadcast since 1987 on over 100 public television stations throughout the United States. The first public television station that agreed to carry her show was KSPS-TV.

In 2000, the corporation filed for a non-profit status, and was granted the right to be a "501(c)(3) charitable organization."

References

Physical exercise
PBS original programming
Charities based in Washington (state)
1987 American television series debuts
1990s American television series
2000s American television series
2010s American television series
Health charities in the United States
Medical and health organizations based in Washington (state)